Metacyclops campestris is a species of copepod in the family Cyclopidae.

The IUCN conservation status of Metacyclops campestris is conservation dependent. The IUCN status was reviewed in 1996.

References

Cyclopidae
Articles created by Qbugbot
Crustaceans described in 1987